S. Tarlochan Singh (born 28 July 1933) is an Indian politician. He is a Member of the Parliament of India, representing Haryana. He served as Chairman National Commission for Minorities from 2003 to 2006 (Union Cabinet of India cabinet minister status), was member, National Human Rights Commission of India, Govt. of India, 2003 to 2006. He served as Vice Chairman, National Commission for Minorities from 2000 to 2003 (Union Cabinet of India, State Minister Rank).

He has done tremendous work for Sikhs around the world .  He made huge efforts for the rescue and settlement of sikhs from Afghanistan after the civil war there .  He published calendars and developed museums on Sikh history . He has traveled worldwide to educate people about the teachings and values of Sikhism . In 2008 he visited Maine in United States to give lectures on Sikhism to the students of Colby College .He was awarded India's third highest civilian award the Padma Bhushan in 2021.

Childhood and education
Tarlochan Singh was born on 28 July 1933, to Shmt. Ram Piari and S. Balwant Singh in Dhudial, Punjab (now in Chakwal District, Pakistan). He is the eldest amongst three siblings. He did his early schooling in Khalsa School at Dhudial and then moved to Patiala at the time of Partition in 1947. The time after Partition was very difficult time for him and his family. For some time he had to work along with his studies. He went to the Panjab University, Chandigarh to study Economics and attained his master's degree in 1955. He is an alumnus of Mohindra College of Patiala.

Early career
After completing his master's degree in Economics, Singh started his career in civil service as Public Relations Officer in Punjab. He served as Joint Secretary, Development, Punjab Markfed from 1972 till 1977. Markfed is the largest cooperative organization in Asia . He then served as Jt. Director, Public Relations Deptt in 1977 and served in this position till 1980. He was Additional Director, Department of Tourism, Culture, Museum and Archaeology, Government of Punjab from 1980 to 1982. He served as Director, Publicity and Public Relations of IXth Asian Games Organising Committee, New Delhi from 1982–1983.

During his stint as managing director of Delhi Tourism, he developed two of the Delhi's most popular tourist places: Dilli Haat and Hauz Khaz Tourist Complex, for which he won Pacific Asia Travel Association Gold awards .

Work done as Member Parliament Rajya Sabha 
 He moved a calling attention motion on the relief to the victims of 1984 riots in the Rajya Sabha.
 He is the first Sikh MP who has moved a bill in the Parliament to amend Section 25 of Indian constitution, this is where the Sikhs have been described as part of Hindus. The amendment is to seek independent status for the Sikhs as a separate religion. This bill came twice on the agenda for discussion but due to disturbance it could not be debated. This is still pending for discussion.
 He moved an amendment in the Anand Marriage Act which was passed in 1908. There is no provision in this act of registration of Sikh marriages. Now Sikhs are getting registration certificates under Hindu Marriage Act. The Parliamentary Committee on law & justice has already approved the proposal. Law Minister has made assurance in the Rajya Sabha of getting this bill passed at earliest. This will be a major step towards officially recognizing the Sikhism as a separate religion.
 Demanded the withdrawal of Gallantry awards from the Army Officers who participated in the Blue Star Operation.
 In the constitutional review commission he appeared as a Sikh representative & on his plea the commission had recommended the necessary amendment in Section 25 of Indian Constitution.
 He got an Air India flight approved to Toronto from Amritsar.
 He got an Air India flight approved to Vancouver from Amritsar.
 He made efforts to get approval to upgrade Chandigarh Domestic Airport to International airport from Parliament.
 He got sanction for Maharaja Ranjit Singh's statue in Parliament complex & Rs. 25 Lakhs payment was made by Shri Atal Bihari Vajpayee, then Prime Minister.
 It was his efforts that Rajya Sabha took a decision of installing the Statue of Shahid Bhagat Singh in the Parliament.
 He is the first Member Parliament who spoke in Punjabi in the Parliament. It took him about two years to get the facility of immediate translation of Punjabi in other languages, so that the other MPs can understand the speech.
 He demanded in the Parliament that the Nankana Sahib Sikh pilgrims should be given the same facilities as the Haj pilgrims get.
 He moved a calling attention notice in Rajya Sabha on the progress of relief to the victims of 1984 riots.

Accomplishments
 As Chairman National Commission for Minorities
 He got maximum facilities for refugees from Afghanistan. He got them permissions to travel to India from US & UK & also got special papers issued for working in India.
 He got a bill passed in Haryana Assembly for granting second language status to Punjabi in 2004 by Shri Om Prakash Chautala. On his request a meeting was held in Home Ministry in 2004 which was presided by Shri L.K.Advani & Punjabi & Urdu were granted second language status in Delhi.
 He got visas to hundreds of Sikhs who were in the black list in Canada, US & UK. He has been advocating for abolishing the black list.
 After Kargil war in 1999 all movements between India & Pakistan were stopped. He got sanction of the Sikh Jattha to go for pilgrimage from the Prime Minister.
 He brought sanction for the Sikhs living in Pakistan to come to India for pilgrimage as a group. This was not allowed for fifty years.
 It was his efforts that Government of India honored Air Chief Marshal Arjan Singh DFC with the title of Marshal of the AIr Force. Field Marshal Madappa Cariappa OBE and Sam Manekshaw were only other Field Marshals in the history of India.(Marshal of the Air Force, Marshal of the Fleet  & Filed Marshal are highest ranks of IAF, Indian Navy & Army awarded for the lifetime to the retired Chiefs of the Services for exceptional service to the nation. only 03 officer were awarded this five star general rank in the history of India)
  He intervened as Chairman National Commission for Minorities when there was a move to form Defense services supreme counsel in 2004. By this move General Joginder Jaswant Singh, popularly known as J.J. Singh would have retired as Lt. General. He succeeded in getting consent of Prime Minister to scuttle the move. General J.J. Singh was promoted as Army Chief subsequently.
 As Chairman and Managing Director of the Delhi Tourism and Transportation Development Corporation
 Developed Hauz Khas Tourist Complex
 Dilli Haat.
 Started annual festivals in Delhi
 Qutub Festival.
 International Mango Festival.
 Garden Festival.
 As the Additional Director, Department of Tourism, Culture, Museum and Government of Punjab.
 Established the Guru Teg Bahadur Museum in Anandpur Shahib in 1978.
 The Maharaja Ranjit Singh Museum Amritsar in 1980.
 Shaheed Bhagat Singh Museum in Khatkar Kalan in 1988.
 As Director Public Relations Department.
 He acquired a lithograph of Golden Temple, Amritsar – 1834 from London & got published from Public Relation Department, Punjab in 1978. This picture is displayed all over the world in Sikh houses.
 He brought about 20 Sikh Relics from Victoria Museum, London for display in Amritsar in 1980.
 As Director Markfed, Government of Punjab
 Published the first Sikh art calendar in 1971. The second calendar in 1972 on Sikh Martyrs was banned by the Parliament but later on was allowed to be released. SGPC copied this calendar for worldwide distribution.
 He organized special editions of the Marg magazine edited by Mulk Raj Anand, the world-famous writer. One issue was on Amritsar, and the second on Maharaja Ranjit Singh.
 He prepared a catalogue of Sikh Relics lying in UK in 1975 with the help of Dr. W.C. Archer, who was responsible for locating Guru Gobind Singh's arms in 1966 in UK.

Posts held
 Joint Secretary, Development, Punjab MARKFED (largest cooperative organization in Asia) (1970–77).
 Joint Director, Public Relations Department (1977–1980).
 Additional Director, Department of Tourism, Culture, Museum and Archaeology, Government of Punjab (1980–1982).
 Director, Publicity and Public Relations of IXth Asian Games Organising Committee, New Delhi (1982–1983).
 Press Secretary to President of India (1983–1987).
 Managing Director, Delhi Tourism Development Corporation (1987–1993).
 Advisor, Tourism, Government of India (1993–1994).
 Chairman, Delhi Tourism and Transportation Development Corporation (1997–1999).
 Vice-Chairman, National Commission for Minorities (2000–2003).
 Member, National Commission on Population (2003–2005).
 Chairman, National Commission for Minorities, Government of India (with the status of Union Cabinet Minister) (2003–2006).
 Ex-Officio Member, National Human Rights Commission (2003–2006).
 Member Rajya Sabha (2004 – present)
 Member, Committee on Social Justice and Empowerment Member, General Purposes Committee (August, 2004 to October 2006).
 Member, Consultative Committee for the Ministry of Civil Aviation (October 2004 – Present)
 Member, Committee of Privileges (December, 2005 to August, 2006).
 Member, Joint Parliamentary Committee on Food Management in Parliament House Complex (April 2006 – Present).
 Member, Parliamentary Forum on Population and Public Health (May, 2006 – present).
 Member, Committee on Personnel, Public Grievances, Law and Justice Member, Committee on Papers Laid on the Table (October, 2006 – present).

Awards won
 Padma Bhushan by the President of India, 2021.
 Pacific Asia Travel Association Gold awards.
 Conference on Women Welfare, London, 2006 Awarded.
 Asiad Vishisht Jyoti by the President of India, 1983.
 Indira Gandhi Award of Excellence.
 Best Punjabi Award by the Punjabi Association, Chennai.
 Special Award for promoting Punjabi Culture by the Government of Punjab.
 Award of Excellence by the 61st All India Sikh Education Conference from the Educational Committee Chief Khalsa Diwan, Amritsar, October 2002.
 Punjabi Ratan Award by the World Punjabi Organization.
 Glory of Nation Award 'Fakhr-e-Mulk' in All India Conference for National Development on 21 December 2003 by the ISRF (India) MWS, 4U & TEVOR.
 Citation by County Executive State of New York, 2004 for exemplary services towards harmonious relations between India and the United States of America.
 Millennium Sikh Award by Shiromani Institute, Delhi.
 Goodwill Ambassador Award by International People Society.

Books published
 Narian Tahia Itihas.
 Saajan Des Videshre

Sports, clubs, association
 Vice-President, Indian Olympic Association.
 Vice-President, Archery Association of India.
 Patron, World Punjabi Organization.
 Patron, International Punjabi Society.
 Member, Delhi Golf Club.
 Member, DDA Golf Club.
 Member, Delhi Race Club.

Video links
 
 .

References

 Tarlochan Singh website
 Tarlochan Singh: A Chequered Career
 Tarlochan Singh's visit to Maine, US
 Tarlochan Singh writes to Miramax
 Tarlochan Singh's India Govt. profile
 Tarlochan Singh's appeal as Minority Commission Chairman
  Issue of conversion overplayed: Tarlochan Singh
 Dear brethren, please listen to Mr Tarlochan Singh
 Tarlochan Singh Makes Historic Push for Sikh Rights
 Demanded equal rights for the Nankana Sahib pilgrims as the Haj Pilgrims have.
 Raising the Turban Issue in Sharjah with the Government
 Are northern states ignoring Punjabi?
 Sikhs need government attention
 MP highlights troubles faced by Sikhs abroad in Lok Sabha
 http://www.milligazette.com/Archives/2005/16-31May05-Print-Edition/163105200530.htm
 http://ia.rediff.com/www/news/2005/aug/09ncm.htm
 http://ia.rediff.com/www/news/2002/apr/16onkar.htm
 http://ia.rediff.com/www/news/2007/may/10atwal.htm
 http://www.tribuneindia.com/2009/20090707/punjab.htm#2
 http://www.tribuneindia.com/2009/20091126/punjab.htm#2

External links
 Profile on Rajya Sabha website
 Profile on Harayan Assembly site
 Website: Tarlochan Singh

People from Chakwal District
Rajya Sabha members from Haryana
1933 births
Living people
People from Patiala